Governor Simcoe Secondary School  named after John Graves Simcoe, is a public high school in St. Catharines, Ontario, Canada.  It is a three-floored school with a theatre attachment.  It has an enrollment of about 859 students.

Its campus contains a football/soccer/field hockey field and a three-story building. The building includes a full gymnasium with multiple changing rooms with showers, a weight room, an elevator, and a 500-seat auditorium.  The school also is fully wheelchair accessible.

History
Governor Simcoe opened its doors in 1971; it was the first open concept high school in the Niagara Peninsula.  The first principal was Bob Hayes. Since then, the open concept has been replaced with individual classrooms.

In 1995, the Grantham Theatre was added to the east end of the school, while originally designed to seat 1000 people, due to budget, it was only built to seat 500.

Academics
During the 2007/08 school year, Governor Simcoe changed to a Multi-Subject Instructional Period (MSIP) Schedule. This schedule consists of five classes instead of the regular four. The Five-Period Day consists of four instructional periods of 60 minutes and a multi grade supervised MSIP period of 60 minutes.  The MSIP class is created by reducing each of
the instructional periods from 75 minutes to 60 minutes.  The MSIP class is essentially
made up of ‘bits’ of instructional time (4 x 15 = 60 minutes), thus its name Multi-Subject
Instructional Period.

Athletics
The "Athletic" Program provides students with the opportunity to compete at the highest level possible. The underlying goal of such competition is developed within each student life skills such as dedication, teamwork, group dynamics, a sense of belonging, and the importance of hard work. Notably dominant sports at GSSS have been the performance of the senior girls' and boys' basketball teams who have won many SOSSA and OFSAA titles, as well as the Lightweight Men's rowing crews, which are always some of the top in the country.

Robotics
The FIRST Robotics Competition Team 1114, Simbotics, at Governor Simcoe is an international championship winning program. They have won the FIRST Championship in 2008, came in second in 2010, and have been champions at many regional events (Greater Toronto Regional 2005-2010; Waterloo Regional 2006-2008, 2010, 2011; Pittsburgh Regional 2010, 2011; Midwest Regional 2008; Great Lakes Regional 2006; Long Island Regional 2004). Team 1114 also participates in the VEX Robotics Competition. They have won three VEX world championships in 2006, 2007, and in 2011.

Fundraising
In 2007, the Staff and Students of Governor Simcoe held their first annual AIDS 'Walk-a-thon' and raised money for the Stephen Lewis Foundation, which helps to ease the pain of people living with HIV and AIDS.

Toronto Bands Crush Luther and Grand:PM as well as the radio station z101.1 were there to help the school reach its goal by holding a concert behind the school for the staff and students. Governor Simcoe raised over $15,000.00 for the Stephen Lewis Foundation.

See also
List of high schools in Ontario

References

External links
 Governor Simcoe
 District School Board of Niagara

High schools in the Regional Municipality of Niagara
1971 establishments in Ontario
Educational institutions established in 1971
Buildings and structures in St. Catharines